Kayahan'ın En İyileri No.1 is a tribute album released in late 2014 to the late Turkish singer Kayahan Açar. It was recorded by numerous artists, including Tarkan, Sezen Aksu, Sıla, Nilüfer, Gülşen, Ajda Pekkan, Mustafa Ceceli, and Emre Aydın, among others.

Background
At the time of the album's recording, Açar had been diagnosed with a form of soft-tissue sarcoma, which he had recovered from twice in the past. In response to the recurrence of the disease, as a tribute, the compilation underwent recording and production until its release on November 28, 2014. The album compiled several of his most commercially successful and memorable songs, thus making it a greatest hits album as well, of which it was his only ever recorded out of his previous 18 albums. Açar died on April 3, 2015.

Track listing

See also
Kayahan
Turkish pop music

References

Tribute albums
2014 albums
Turkish-language albums